Bryan Woodward Morse (August 21, 1885 – January 23, 1939) was an American football, basketball, and track coach at George Washington University in Washington, D.C. He was later a sportswriter and hunting and finishing  columnist for The Washington Herald. Morse died on January 23, 1939, in Washington, D.C.

Head coaching record

Football

References

External links
 

1885 births
1939 deaths
20th-century American journalists
American male journalists
American sportswriters
Clarkson Golden Knights football players
George Washington Colonials football coaches
George Washington Colonials football players
George Washington Colonials men's basketball coaches
College track and field coaches in the United States
Sports coaches from Washington, D.C.
Coaches of American football from Washington, D.C.
Basketball coaches from Washington, D.C.